The First National Bank of Norden, at 503 Main Av. in Lake Norden, South Dakota, was built in 1920.  It was listed on the National Register of Historic Places in 2005.

It is a one-and-a-half-story brick and reinforced concrete building, on a concrete foundation.  It has a pink Kasota limestone facade.  It was designed by Louis F. Dow Co. in Classical Revival style.  It has also been known as the Farmers State Bank of Norden, asFirst National Bank & Trust Co, as First State Bank, and as First Premier Bank.

References

Bank buildings on the National Register of Historic Places in South Dakota
Neoclassical architecture in South Dakota
Buildings and structures completed in 1920
Hamlin County, South Dakota